Robert Bruce Fraser Peirce (February 17, 1843 – December 5, 1898) was an American lawyer,  Civil War veteran and politician who served one term as a U.S. Representative from Indiana from 1881 to 1883.

Early life and career 
Born in Laurel, Indiana, Peirce attended the public schools and was also educated by private tutors.

Civil War 
He served in the Civil War as second lieutenant of Company H, One Hundred and Thirty-fifth Regiment, Indiana Volunteers.

Legal career 
He graduated from Wabash College, Crawfordsville, Indiana, in 1866 and studied law at Shelbyville, Indiana. He was admitted to the bar in 1866 and commenced practice in Crawfordsville in 1867.

Congress 
Peirce was elected prosecuting attorney of Montgomery County in 1868 and reelected in 1870 and 1872. He was then elected as a Republican to the Forty-seventh Congress (March 4, 1881 – March 3, 1883). He was an unsuccessful candidate for reelection in 1882 to the Forty-eighth Congress.

Later career and death 
He resumed the practice of law, and was appointed receiver for the Toledo, St. Louis and Western Railroad.

He died in Indianapolis, Indiana, and was interred in Oak Hill Cemetery, Crawfordsville, Indiana.

References

1843 births
1898 deaths
People from Franklin County, Indiana
People of Indiana in the American Civil War
Wabash College alumni
Union Army officers
19th-century American politicians
Burials in Indiana
Republican Party members of the United States House of Representatives from Indiana